Andriy Petrovych Khanas (born 26 July 1984) is a Ukrainian retired professional footballer who played as a defender and current assistant manager at Shakhtar Donetsk.

Honours
Sokil Zolochiv
 Ukrainian Second League, Group A runner-up: 2001–02

Metalist Kharkiv
 Ukrainian First League runner-up: 2003–04

Lviv
 Ukrainian First League runner-up: 2007–08

References

External links
 
 

1984 births
Living people
Ukrainian footballers
Ukraine under-21 international footballers
Association football defenders
FC Karpaty-3 Lviv players
FC Karpaty-2 Lviv players
FC Sokil Zolochiv players
FC Arsenal Kyiv players
FC CSKA Kyiv players
FC Metalist Kharkiv players
FC Hazovyk-Skala Stryi players
FC Lviv players
FC Knyazha Shchaslyve players
FC Feniks-Illichovets Kalinine players
FC Sambir players
Ukrainian Premier League players
Ukrainian First League players
Ukrainian Second League players
Ukrainian Amateur Football Championship players
Ukrainian football managers
FC Lviv managers
FC Shakhtar Donetsk non-playing staff
Ukrainian Second League managers
Sportspeople from Lviv Oblast